Grégory José Henri Béranger (born 30 August 1981) is a French former footballer who played mainly as a left back.

He spent the vast majority of his professional career in Spain, amassing Segunda División totals of 172 matches and two goals in representation of Racing de Ferrol, Numancia, Las Palmas, Tenerife and Elche. In La Liga, he appeared for Espanyol.

Club career
Béranger was born in Nice. After starting out professionally with AS Cannes in the lower leagues he moved to Spain in 2005, playing three seasons in its second division, two of those with CD Numancia. In 2007–08, he was one of the Soria team's most utilised players (37 matches, 3.313 minutes of action) as they returned to La Liga after a three-year absence.

On 16 May 2008, Béranger signed for RCD Espanyol who paid his buyout clause. He made his league debut on 30 August, playing the entire 1–0 home win against Real Valladolid. He also struggled with some injuries and, late into the campaign, was involved in a training incident with teammate Carlos Kameni.

Béranger returned to the Spanish second tier after 21 competitive games at the RCDE Stadium, being loaned to UD Las Palmas. In July 2010, one month shy of his 29th birthday, he was definitely released by Espanyol, resuming his career in the same division with CD Tenerife.

After retiring, Béranger remained in Spain and worked as a youth coach at his last club Elche CF.

Honours
Numancia
Segunda División: 2007–08

Elche
Segunda División: 2012–13

References

External links

1981 births
Living people
Footballers from Nice
French footballers
Association football defenders
AS Cannes players
La Liga players
Segunda División players
Racing de Ferrol footballers
CD Numancia players
RCD Espanyol footballers
UD Las Palmas players
CD Tenerife players
Elche CF players
French expatriate footballers
Expatriate footballers in Spain
French expatriate sportspeople in Spain